Savitribai Deshmukh (died c. 1680-1690), better known by her title Rai Bagan or Raibagan (lit. "Royal Tigress"), was a female Mughal general under the Emperor Aurangzeb. She was the widow of the Mughal sardar Raje Udaram Deshmukh of Mahur jagir in Deccan. After her son's death in Battle of Samugarh, she led her forces aiding the then prince Aurangzeb in the battle, which paved his way to become the emperor. The emperor conferred upon her the royal title. She aided Aurangzeb's uncle Shaista Khan in the Mughal campaign against the Maratha empire's founder Shivaji.

Battle of Samugarh 
In 1658, prince Aurangzeb rebelled against his father Shah Jahan, when he heard about his illness. It was the war of accession in which Aurangzeb fought with his brother Dara Shikoh. The Mughal Empire split into two factions, one with Aurangzeb and another with Dara. They fought the final Battle of Samugarh near Agra. Jagjivanrao, son of the late Mughal Sardar Raje Udaram and Savitribai, fought alongside Aurangzeb. He died at Samugarh. When his troops were left leaderless, Savitribai led his troops, however her identity remained hidden from the prince. Aurangzeb saw her fighting. He was so impressed because she was the only female warrior in the Mughal Army.

When Aurangzeb crowned himself, he ordered Savitribai to be presented before him. She appeared before him in his court. He inquired about her and discovered her identity as the mother of the fallen troop leader Jagjivanrao. Even when her only son died in front of her eyes, she led the troops and fought valiantly. Aurangzeb was so impressed that he gave her the title of Raibagan, "Royal Tigress".

Confrontation with Chatrapati Shivaji Maharaj 

In 1661, when Shaista Khan was appointed governor of Deccan by Aurangzeb, he captured Pune and nearby main stations while Shivaji was stuck in the siege of Panhala Fort by the Bijapur sultanate. When Shivaji escaped the siege and finally managed to reach his base Rajgad Fort, he turned his focus on Shahista Khan. Shivaji made truces with Shahista Khan and also with Ali Adil Shah II of Bijapur. Raibagan was told to assist Shahista Khan. Meanwhile, Shahista Khan appointed Kartalab Khan and Raibagan to attack Konkan, which was under Shivaji control. Khan gave around 20,000 forces to both of them. They chose the path of Kurvanda Ghat. Shivaji and his army were waiting for them in the forest near Umberkhind (Umber Gorge). In the Battle of Umberkhind, around 300-400 Maratha archers and swordsmen led by Shivaji defeated the Mughals. Raibagan, after seeing his bravery and fighting skills, started to praise Shivaji. She praised him even in the court of Shahista Khan and criticized Shahista Khan fearlessly. Since she had saved the whole army of Mughals, Aurangzeb praised Raibagan for her presence of mind.

In April 1663, Shivaji made a surgical strike on Lal Mahal where Shahista Khan was camping in Pune. Khan escaped with heavy losses. Later, he was sent to Bengal on the orders of Aurangzeb. Raibagan was ordered to patrol in the Pune area.

According to Sabhasad Bakhar, Raibagan again confronted Shivaji during the Battle of Surat in January 1664. She lost her fight and was captured. Shivaji showed hospitality towards her, honoured her and sent her back. She was then sent back to her jagir. She retired from military service. She died around 1680-1690.

References

Mughal Empire people
17th-century Indian women
17th-century Indian people
Marathi people